Mitsuba Ibaraki (born 7 May 1998) is a Japanese professional footballer who plays as a midfielder for WE League club MyNavi Sendai.

Club career 
Ibaraki made her WE League debut on 12 September 2021.

References

External links 
 
 

Living people
1998 births
Women's association football midfielders
WE League players
Japanese women's footballers
Albirex Niigata Ladies players
Mynavi Vegalta Sendai Ladies players
Association football people from Kumamoto Prefecture